The New Orleans, Jackson and Great Northern was a   gauge railway originally commissioned by the State of Illinois, with both Stephen Douglas and Abraham Lincoln being among its supporters in the 1851 Illinois Legislature. It connected Canton, Mississippi, with New Orleans and was completed just prior to the American Civil War, in which it served strategic interests, especially for the Confederacy. The New Orleans, Jackson and Great Northern was largely in ruins by the end of the War.
From 1866 to 1870, when a hostile takeover induced a change of leadership, the president of the New Orleans, Jackson and Great Northern was P. G. T. Beauregard (1818-1893), former Confederate States Army general under whose command the first shots had been fired on Fort Sumter and who during the war helped design the Confederate battle flag.

Restored as part of the Mississippi Central Railroad (1852-1874), the properties originally belonging to the New Orleans, Jackson and Great Northern were merged into the Illinois Central Railroad in 1878. In 1972, it became the Illinois Central Gulf Railroad, after merging with the Gulf, Mobile and Ohio Railroad.

In 1998 the Illinois Central Railroad merged into the Canadian National Railway system. The original rights-of-way for the New Orleans, Jackson and Great Northern not only serve the purpose of a major freight railway but also support Amtrak passenger service.

References

Defunct Louisiana railroads
Defunct Mississippi railroads
Predecessors of the Canadian National Railway
Railroads in the Chicago metropolitan area
5 ft gauge railways in the United States
P. G. T. Beauregard